Antonios Kalamogdartis (Greek: Αντώνιος Καλαμογδάρτης, 1810–1856) was a Greek revolutionary leader and a politician which he was elected many times.

He was born in 1810 in Patras. He continued his studies and he began to learn French and Italian. He was enrolled into the military body of Favieros. He battled many battles and distincted him in the siege of the Acropolis in Athens. He was an attorney at the national council between 1843 and 1844.

He was councilled into the in 1854 and battled the Turks for the liberation of Epirus where he was hurt and injured. He later pardoned freely and mainly headed for Nafplio and later for Patras. He translated many poems from French and Italian and was the poetic literature. He had in occupation in the outer area in the area of Chalkomata in that and had the name the desert of Chalkomata.

He was married to Vasiliki Lontou, sister of the mayor of Patras Andreas Ch. Lontos and had two daughters.

References
Istoria tis poleos Patron (Ιστορία της πόλεως Πατρών = History Of The City Of Patras, Stefanos Thomopoulos, Achaikes publishers SET 
Patra mia elliniki protevoussa ston 19o eona (Πάτρα μία ελληνική πρωτεύουσα στον 19ο αιώνα Patras, A Greek Capital In The 19th Century), second ecition Nikos Bakounakis, Kastaniotis publishers , Athens 1995
Peloponnisioi agonistes tou 1821, Nikitara apomnimonevmata (Πελοποννήσιοι αγωνιστές του 1821, Νικηταρά απομνημονεύματα = Peloponnesian Revolutionary Leaders of 1821, Nikitaras Remembered), Fotakou, Vergina Publishers, Athens 1996
This article is translated and is based from the article at the Greek Wikipedia (el:Main Page)

1810 births
1856 deaths
Greek people of the Greek War of Independence
Politicians from Patras
Military personnel from Patras